"At the Hop"  is a 1950s pop song written by Artie Singer, John Medora, and David White and originally released by Danny & the Juniors. The song was released in the fall of 1957 and reached number one on the US charts on January 6, 1958, becoming one of the top-selling singles of 1958. "At the Hop" also hit number one on the R&B Best Sellers list. Somewhat more surprisingly, the record reached #3 on the Music Vendor country charts. It was also a big hit elsewhere, which included a number 3 placing on the UK charts.

The song returned to prominence after it was performed by rock and roll revival act Sha Na Na at the 1969 Woodstock Festival and featured in the 1973 coming-of-age teen comedy American Graffiti. Musically, it is notable for combining several of the most popular formulas in 1950s rock'n'roll, the twelve-bar blues, boogie-woogie piano, and the 50s progression.

The original version by Danny & the Juniors was included in Robert Christgau's "Basic Record Library" of 1950s and 1960s recordings, published in Christgau's Record Guide: Rock Albums of the Seventies (1981).

Background
The song was written by White, Medora, and Singer in 1957, when Danny & the Juniors were still called The Juvenairs. Initially called "Do the Bop", the song was heard by Dick Clark, who expressed concern that the dance fad of doing The Bop was on its way out, so he suggested they change the band name to the Juniors and the chorus from "Let's all do the Bop" to "Let's go to the Hop".  After performing the song on Clark's show American Bandstand, it gained popularity and went to the top of the US charts, remaining at number one for five weeks.

The song describes the scene at a record hop, particularly the dances being performed and the interaction with the disc jockey host.

A sample of the song's lyrics (contemporary popular dances in italics):

You can rock it you can roll it
Do the stomp and even stroll it
At the hop.
When the record starts spinnin'
You chalypso and you chicken at the hop
Do the dance sensation that is sweepin' the nation
at the hop

Payola involvement 
On the 2008 nationally-televised PBS documentary Wages of Spin: Dick Clark, American Bandstand and the Payola Scandals, Singer claimed that Dick Clark would not play "At the Hop" without receiving half of the publishing proceeds. Singer agreed to make the payments and called the situation "bittersweet" because although he didn't like having to give the money, he credited his success in the music industry to Clark and therefore was grateful to him. Payola was not illegal at the time and Clark sold the song prior to the 1960 payola hearings.

Cover versions
Children's entertainer's Sharon, Lois & Bram covered the song on their 1995 album titled Let's Dance!.
Singer Nick Todd, brother of Pat Boone, reached the Billboard Top 100 with his cover.
New Orleans based band Dash Rip Rock recorded a parody version titled "(Lets Go) Smoke Some Pot".
It was sung by Elvis Presley in Bad Nauheim in 1959, and can be found on the bootleg album Greetings from Germany.
The song was also covered and recorded between October 1984 and January 1985 by The Beach Boys for their 1985 self-titled album, though it never made the final cut.
"At The Hop" was covered by Austrian singer Freddy Quinn in 1958.
The song was part of Uriah Heep's song "Rock'n'Roll Medley", to be found on Live 1973.
The 1988 film Pound Puppies and the Legend of Big Paw featured a variation on the song called "At the Pound". A music video of the song promoting the film was included on various Family Home Entertainment video cassettes.
American retro rock-and-roll band Flash Cadillac & the Continental Kids covered the song as part of the sound track for the 1973 film American Graffiti. In the film, the band portrayed a fictional band named "Herby and the Heartbeats".  The cover was released as a single in 1973.
 Les Forbans recorded a cover in 1983 under the title "Leve ton ful de là".
 In 1973 a Danish version, Rend og hop, was recorded by the local band Bamses Venner.

Soundtrack appearances
"At the Hop" was performed at Woodstock by Sha-Na-Na in August 1969, and was included on the soundtrack album.
It was also performed by Flash Cadillac & the Continental Kids and included on the soundtrack for the 1973 movie American Graffiti. This recording was produced by Kim Fowley.
The Kidsongs franchise covered this song in their 1997 home video, "I Can Dance".
Scooter performs this song on the Teresa Brewer episode of The Muppet Show. Some frogs joined him, and, upon reaching the chorus, began jumping around. Although Scooter tried to tell them to finish the song, they didn't, and, like multiple songs on the show, the song ended abruptly.
The Family Guy episode "Let's Go to the Hop" is named after the song's chorus.
It is played frequently in the American radio program The Savage Nation, hosted by talk show host Michael Savage.
The song is used in the video game Mafia II.
The song is sampled in the 1989 song "Swing the Mood" by Jive Bunny and the Mastermixers.
The song is used in the Netflix animated series Kid Cosmic.

See also
List of Billboard number-one rhythm and blues hits
List of Billboard number-one singles of 1958
Billboard year-end top 50 singles of 1958
List of Cash Box Top 100 number-one singles of 1958
List of CHUM number-one singles of 1957

References

1957 singles
1958 singles
Danny & the Juniors songs
Billboard Top 100 number-one singles
Cashbox number-one singles
List songs
ABC Records singles
1957 songs
Songs written by David White (musician)
Songs written by John Medora
Songs about dancing
Songs about parties